The 2012 Curl Atlantic Championship was held from September 14 to 17 at the Tantramar Civic Centre in Sackville, New Brunswick. This was the second time the event was held, and is designed to give top Atlantic curling teams the opportunity to play on arena ice. The winning teams of Eddie MacKenzie and Stacie Devereaux each took home CAD$3,000.

Men

Teams
Entered Teams

Group A

Group B

Standings

Group A

Group B

Results

Draw 1
September 14, 8:00 AM AT

Draw 2
September 14, 12:00 PM AT

Draw 3
September 14, 4:00 PM AT

Draw 4
September 14, 8:00 PM AT

Draw 5
September 15, 8:00 AM AT

Draw 6
September 15, 12:00 PM AT

Draw 7
September 15, 4:00 PM AT

Draw 8
September 15, 8:00 PM AT

Draw 9
September 16, 8:00 AM AT

Draw 10
September 16, 12:00 PM AT

Draw 11
September 16, 4:00 PM AT

Draw 12
September 16, 8:00 PM AT

Playoffs

Semifinals

A2 vs. B1
September 17, 9:00 AM AT

A1 vs. B2
September 17, 9:00 AM AT

Final
September 17, 1:30 PM AT

Women

Teams
Entered Teams

Group A

Group B

Standings

Group A

Group B

Results

Draw 1
September 14, 8:00 AM AT

Draw 2
September 14, 12:00 PM AT

Draw 3
September 14, 4:00 PM AT

Draw 4
September 14, 8:00 PM AT

Draw 5
September 15, 8:00 AM AT

Draw 6
September 15, 12:00 PM AT

Draw 7
September 15, 4:00 PM AT

Draw 8
September 15, 8:00 PM AT

Draw 9
September 16, 8:00 AM AT

Draw 10
September 16, 12:00 PM AT

Draw 11
September 16, 4:00 PM AT

Draw 12
September 16, 8:00 PM AT

Playoffs

Semifinals

A2 vs. B1
September 17, 9:00 AM AT

A1 vs. B2
September 17, 9:00 AM AT

Final
September 17, 1:30 PM AT

References

At
Sackville, New Brunswick
Curling competitions in New Brunswick
2012 in New Brunswick